Kilimanjaro is a 2013 American independent romantic drama film starring Brian Geraghty and Abigail Spencer.

Cast
 Brian Geraghty as Doug
 Alexia Rasmussen as Clare
 Chris Marquette as Mitch
 Abigail Spencer as Yvonne
 Bruce Altman as Milton Jr. 
 Henny Russell as Ellen
 Jim Gaffigan as Bill
 John Cullum as Milton Sr.
 Diego Klattenhoff as Troy

Reception
Mike D'Angelo of The Dissolve awarded the film three stars out of five.  Matt Goldberg of Collider gave the film a D rating.

References

External links
 
 
 

American independent films
American romantic drama films
2013 independent films
2013 romantic drama films
2013 films
Films scored by Jake Monaco
2010s English-language films
2010s American films
English-language romantic drama films